111 (One hundred [and] eleven) is the natural number following 110 and preceding 112.

In mathematics
111 is a perfect totient number.

111 is R3 or the second repunit, a number like 11, 111, or 1111 that consists of repeated units, or 1's. It equals 3 × 37, therefore all triplets (numbers like 222 or 777) in base ten are of the form 3n × 37. As a repunit, it also follows that 111 is a palindromic number.

All triplets in all bases are multiples of 111 in that base, therefore the number represented by 111 in a particular base is the only triplet that can ever be prime. 111 is not prime in base ten, but is prime in base two, where 1112 = 710. It is also prime in these other bases up to 128: 3, 5, 6, 8, 12, 14, 15, 17, 20, 21, 24, 27, 33, 38, 41, 50, 54, 57, 59, 62, 66, 69, 71, 75, 77, 78, 80, 89, 90, 99, 101, 105, 110, 111, 117, 119 

In base 18, the number 111 is 73 (= 34310) which is the only base where 111 is a perfect power.

The smallest magic square using only 1 and prime numbers has a magic constant of 111:

A six-by-six magic square using the numbers 1 to 36 also has a magic constant of 111:

(The square has this magic constant because 1 + 2 + 3 + ... + 34 + 35 + 36 = 666, and 666 / 6 = 111).

111 is also the magic constant of the n-Queens Problem for n = 6. It is also a nonagonal number.

In base 10, it is a Harshad number as well as a strobogrammatic number.

Nelson

In cricket, the number 111 is sometimes called "a Nelson" after Admiral Nelson, who allegedly only had "One Eye, One Arm, One Leg" near the end of his life. This is in fact inaccurate—Nelson never lost a leg. Alternate meanings include "One Eye, One Arm, One Ambition" and "One Eye, One Arm, One Arsehole".

Particularly in cricket, multiples of 111 are called a double Nelson (222), triple Nelson (333), quadruple Nelson (444; also known as a salamander) and so on.

A score of 111 is considered by some to be unlucky. To combat the supposed bad luck, some watching lift their feet off the ground. Since an umpire cannot sit down and raise his feet, the international umpire David Shepherd had a whole retinue of peculiar mannerisms if the score was ever a Nelson multiple. He would hop, shuffle, or jiggle, particularly if the number of wickets also matched—111/1, 222/2 etc.

In other fields
111 is also:
The atomic number of the element roentgenium (Rg).
The chemical compound 1,1,1-trichloroethane is a chlorinated hydrocarbon that was used as an industrial solvent with a trade name "Solvent 111".
The emergency telephone number in New Zealand; see 111 (emergency telephone number).
NHS 111, a medical helpline in England and Scotland.
It is the lowest positive integer requiring seven syllables to name in English (British and Commonwealth), or six syllables (by dropping the "and") in American English.
The angel number 111 is associated with a balanced life, cooperation, deep love, soulmate, and harmonious relationship with yourself 
Occasionally it is referred to as "eleventy-one", as read in The Fellowship of the Ring by J.R.R. Tolkien.
The first Pacific (4-6-2) locomotive in Great Britain was the Great Western Railway's No. 111 The Great Bear of 1908, designed by George Jackson Churchward. This locomotive was rebuilt into a 4-6-0 Castle Class engine in 1924, renamed Viscount Churchill, and retained the fleet number 111 until scrapped in July 1953.
In Pakistani history, Pakistan Army's 111 Brigade is notorious for being used for staging the coups to overthrow the elected governments in order to impose martial law.

See also
List of highways numbered 111

References

Notes 
Wells, D. The Penguin Dictionary of Curious and Interesting Numbers London: Penguin Group. (1987): 134

External links

Horatio Nelson
Integers